Westgate is a village in County Durham, in North East England. It is situated in Weardale between St John's Chapel and Eastgate. In the 2001 census Westgate had a population of 298.
Westgate is also the entrance to Slitt wood and an old abandoned lead mine. Other features of the village include a caravan site and a football and basketball court.

Westgate Castle was a peel tower-cum-hunting lodge, probably built in the 14th century, and forming the western gatehouse (hence the name) of Stanhope Deer Park owned by the Bishop of Durham. In 1442 the building was granted to Lord Lumley and used for forest courts and administration, but later served as a residence. By 1647 the 'castle' had become ruinous and was 'now demolished' although the 'crumbling walls of an old castle at Westgate' are mentioned in 1791.

There is a Primitive Methodist chapel built 1871 and incorporating an earlier chapel built in 1824.

The Anglican parish church of St Andrew was built in 1864 by Robert Jewell Withers (1824-1894).

Weardale Railway
The village was once served by a railway station on the Weardale Railway that ran up the valley to Wearhead. The line has been preserved and runs between Bishop Auckland and nearby Eastgate-In-Weardale; the former Westgate station is closed and under different use.

References

External links

Villages in County Durham
Stanhope, County Durham